Carex dissitiflora is a tussock-forming species of perennial sedge in the family Cyperaceae. It is native to parts of Japan and Taiwan.

The plant was first formally described by the botanist Adrien René Franchet in 1895 as a part of the work Bulletin de la Societe Philomatique de Paris. There are two subspecies;
 Carex dissitiflora subsp. dissitiflora
 Carex dissitiflora subsp. taiwanensis (Ohwi) T.Koyama

See also
List of Carex species

References

dissitiflora
Taxa named by Adrien René Franchet
Plants described in 1895
Flora of Japan
Flora of Taiwan